The Comprehensive Assessment Program for Junior High School Students or CAP is an exam for junior high school students in the Republic of China (Taiwan).

The CAP is usually held in the weekend of mid-May by the Ministry of Education Republic of China, creating a standardized test for 9th graders. The CAP is an exam for Taiwanese students before going to high school or vocational school, for students, teachers, schools, and parents get to know the students' learning quality. The 2021 CAP was held on 15 and 16 May. The CAP consists of Chinese Language (writing and reading assessment), English (reading and listening assessment), Mathematics (multiple-choice tests and calculation problems), Natural Science (Including: Biology, Chemistry, Physics and Science of Earth) and Social Studies (Including: Geography, History, Personal and Social Study, Politics, Laws, Economics and International Studies)

Time Table 
This is the timetable of CAP. (UTC+8)
 

 You are not allowed to enter the examination room if you are 20 minutes late (except for the English listening test).
 You are not allowed to enter the examination room after the English listening test is broadcast.
 You are not allowed to hand in the exam papers and leave the classroom in less than 30 minutes.
 You are not allowed to hand in the papers earlier during English listening.

Test content  
The examination is a Criterion-referenced test, which means the number of correct answers and their corresponding ranks would have been set before the examination. For the exam, the results of each subject are divided into "精熟" (grade A) and "基礎" (grade B) and "待加強" (grade C). Grade A means that the student is able to master the course in junior high school; Grade B means that the student has the basic ability of the subject; Grade C means that the student's ability in the subject is lagging behind. In grade A and grade B, each will be divided into three smaller levels based on the number of plus signs, such as A, A+, A++, etc.

The subjects are mainly multiple-choice questions with four choices, and a bit of non-choice questions including composition in Chinese, non-choice questions in mathematics, and English listening test in English. Among them, the composition score of Chinese is based on a grading system, with a full score of 6 and a minimum score of 0. In terms of mathematics, there are two to three non-choice questions, each with a full score of 3, accounting for 15% of the total score of the subject; English listening accounts for 20% of the total score of the subject.

Subjects

Regions 
The CAP consists of 14 testing regions. Examinees could only choose one testing region to register for, usually choosing the region where their junior high school is located.
Although the exam questions are unified nationally, the method to calculate their actual scores may vary in different regions.

See also 
Secondary education in Taiwan
K-12 Education Administration
Education in Taiwan

References

External links
 CAP Official Web Site: 

Standardized tests
Education in Taiwan